Rudolph Valentino Regalado (May 21, 1930 – February 12, 2018) was a Major League Baseball player. He was an infielder for the Cleveland Indians from 1954 to 1956, and played in the 1954 World Series.
     
He was born in Los Angeles, California and was of Mexican descent. He died in 2018.

Regalado also played three seasons in the Venezuelan League, winning a batting title with a .366 average while playing for Pampero in the 1958-59 tournament.

References

External links
, or Baseball Reference MiLB
Venezuelan Professional Baseball League statistics

1930 births
2018 deaths
American baseball players of Mexican descent
Baseball players from Los Angeles
Cleveland Indians players
Indianapolis Indians players
Industriales de Valencia players
Leones del Caracas players
American expatriate baseball players in Venezuela
Licoreros de Pampero players
Major League Baseball infielders
Reading Indians players
San Diego Padres (minor league) players
Seattle Rainiers players
USC Trojans baseball players
Glendale High School (Glendale, California) alumni